Daronte Jones (born November 11, 1978) is an American football coach who is the defensive backs coach for the Minnesota Vikings of the National Football League (NFL).

Playing career 
Jones played as a cornerback for one season at Temple in 1996, but then transferred  to Morgan State University. His playing career ended after his second season with the Morgan State after repeated injuries led to nerve damage.

Coaching career

Early coaching career
After being a graduate assistant at Lenoir–Rhyne and coaching safeties at Nicholls State, he was a defensive coordinator for two years at two separate Louisiana high schools. From 2005-2009, Jones was assistant head coach and defensive coordinator at Bowie State University in his home state of Maryland. He spent the 2010 season coaching at UCLA. After a one year stint coaching the Montreal Allouettes of the CFL, he spent 3 years coaching at Hawaii. He then would spend a year in the Big 10 coaching at Wisconsin.

Jones then began coaching in the NFL with the Miami Dolphins, where he worked as assistant defensive backs coach for two seasons. The next two years he spent coaching the secondary for the Cincinnati Bengals. In 2020 he was the defensive backs coach for the Minnesota Vikings.

LSU 
Jones was named the defensive coordinator at LSU on January 26, 2021. He was not retained for the following season.

Minnesota Vikings
On February 23, 2022, Jones returned to the Minnesota Vikings as the team's defensive backs coach for the 2022 season.

References

External links 
 LSU Tigers bio 

1978 births
Living people
African-American coaches of American football
African-American players of American football
Sportspeople from Annapolis, Maryland
People from Capitol Heights, Maryland
Players of American football from Maryland
Coaches of American football from Maryland
American football defensive backs
Morgan State Bears football players
Lenoir–Rhyne Bears football coaches
Nicholls Colonels football coaches
High school football coaches in Louisiana
Bowie State Bulldogs football coaches
UCLA Bruins football coaches
Montreal Alouettes coaches
Hawaii Rainbow Warriors football coaches
Wisconsin Badgers football coaches
Miami Dolphins coaches
Cincinnati Bengals coaches
Minnesota Vikings coaches
LSU Tigers football coaches
20th-century African-American sportspeople